George Benjamin Wittick (1 January 1845 – 30 August 1903),  usually known as Ben Wittick, was an American photographer. He is best known as the author of the only surviving photograph of Billy the Kid.

In 1900, he established his final studio at Fort Wingate.

He is also the author of a photograph of Geronimo.

References

Gallery

American photographers

1845 births
1903 deaths